Dale Smith (February 6, 1928 – January 15, 2017) was an American rodeo cowboy and administrator.

Rodeo career

Competition
Born in Safford, Arizona, Smith was a two-time team roping world champion.  He finished second once a mere $13 away from a third title.  Smith was the first cowboy to qualify for the National Finals Rodeo in three events in the same season. He was also the first to qualify in a total of four events.

Administration
Smith served three non-consecutive stints as the Professional Rodeo Cowboys Association president.  Among his initiatives, he instituted the 100-point system in bull riding.

Honors
Dale Smith is a 1995 inductee of the Rodeo Hall of Fame of the National Cowboy and Western Heritage Museum. He is a 1979 inductee of the ProRodeo Hall of Fame.

Personal life
Smith was a member of the Church of Jesus Christ of Latter-day Saints.

References

1928 births
2017 deaths
ProRodeo Hall of Fame inductees
Roping (rodeo)